Harib (also spelled Harreeb, or Hareeb) may refer to:

Places
Harib Al Qaramish District, Ma'rib Governorate, Yemen
 Harib District, Ma'rib Governorate, Yemen

People
 Khamis Harib, Emirati cyclist who competed at the 1992 Summer Olympics
Mohammed Saeed Harib (born 1978), Emirati animator
Harib Al-Saadi (born 1990), Omani footballer
Harib Al-Habsi (born 1986), Omani footballer

See also

Afghan masculine given names
Iranian masculine given names
Arabic masculine given names
Pakistani masculine given names